Up! is a 1976 soft core sex comedy film directed by Russ Meyer and starring Raven De La Croix, Robert McLane, Kitten Natividad, and Monty Bane.

Plot

A man named Adolf Schwartz, Adolf Hitler in hiding, is living in  a Bavarian-style castle in northern California. After an orgy in the dungeon with three women (The Headsperson, The Ethiopian Chef, Limehouse) and a man (Paul) he is murdered when someone places a ravenous piranha fish in his bathtub.

A voluptuous woman named Margo Winchester appears later in the nearby town Miranda and is spotted by local Sheriff Homer Johnson. He tries to make advances but Margo rejects flirtatiously (at this point). After that she is picked up by Leonard Box, a known troublemaker and son of a sawmill owner. An argument breaks out with the result that Leonard subdues and rapes the unconscious Margo, after that she accidentally kills him. This is witnessed by Homer, but he covers up the incident because Box's loaded father would put Margo in jail forever and of course he is horny for the busty beauty. So Margo and Homer wind up sleeping together, starting some kind of relationship, but a mutually unfaithful one as it can be seen later.

Homer helps Margo get a job at the local diner, Alice's. It is owned by Alice who is married to Paul, who was sexually servicing Schwartz. Alice also likes women, depicted earlier in the movie. Paul is similarly unfaithful, he was interested in Limehouse and after Margo finishes work and goes for a swim at the Salmon Creek, he comes after her. While Margo undresses besides the stream Paul does the same before approaching her and they have sex. Homer, who had stopped a woman earlier for a traffic violation and let her go after a blowjob, is in bed with a Native American woman named Pocohontas and shoves her out of the house when he hears Margo's van approaching, after she and Paul finished their date. Still nude she enters the house, seemingly ready for a second round with Homer who's under the shower to clean himself up. Scalding himself with hot water by accident. Margo comments on his red penis that he must have made it with an Indian!

Kitten Natividad plays the "Greek Chorus", who appears nude between scenes throughout the film to provide narration, plot details, and updates.

Margo performs a strip show at a bar which triggers the reaction of the lumberjack Rafe who rapes her. The other guests join in and flee when Homer arrives, both men end up killing each other!

It is revealed that Alice committed the murder because she was jealous about Schwartz, who was also her father, sleeping with her husband, and that Margo is an undercover cop to investigate the crime.

Cast
Raven De La Croix as Margo Winchester
Edward Schaaf as Adolph Schwartz
Robert McLane as Paul
Kitten Natividad as The Greek Chorus
Candy Samples as The Headsperson (as Mary Gavin)
Su Ling as Limehouse
Janet Wood as Sweet Li'l Alice
Linda Sue Ragsdale as Gwendolyn
Monty Bane as Homer Johnson
Marianne Marks as Chesty Young Thing
Larry Dean as Leonard Box
Bob Schott as Rafe
Foxy Lae as Pocohontas
Ray Reinhardt as The Commissioner
Elaine Collins as The Ethiopian Chef

Production
In the early 1970s Russ Meyer made two flops in a row, The Seven Minutes and Black Snake before returning to his older style with Supervixens. He said ""I'm back to big bosums, square jaws, lotsa action and the most sensational sex you ever saw," he said. "I'm back to what I do best - erotic, comedic sex, sex, sex - and I'll never stray again."

Supervixens was a hit and Meyer said afterwards, "I plan to stick to what I know works and make one X picture after the next and be even more outrageous with sex and keep pushing the boundaries further and further."

"Sure it appeals to prurient interest," said Meyer. "Why not appeal to prurient interest?"

The film starred Kitten Natividad, who Meyer would become romantically involved with. Natividad later said she "loved" making the film. She was comfortably with the nudity "but what was uncomfortable was when he would direct me and I had all these big big lines and he would say, "don't blink" and I was facing the sun and my eyes would get dry... It was uncomfortable making it because I sat on trees that had ants crawling up my ass."

The movie took place and was filmed in and about a small cabin on Salmon Creek near Miranda in Northern California at the summer cabin of Wilfred Bud Kues, listed as part of the movies' production team and a life long friend of Russ Meyer, having met at the Alameda Naval Air Station during World War II and mentioned in Russ' tremendous 3 volume life story.  Bud's 1953 International pick-up and the appearance in the film of the actual town of Miranda Postmaster William Bill Klute were quite real, and still are memories of the older residents of the small Humbolt County town of Miranda.

Meyer said he found "there was a lot of objection to the violence" in the film. "I always felt that they would take it in the manner I presented it. That if a man got a double-bitted axe buried in his chest, he could still wrench it out, run 100 yards and kill a giant with a chainsaw. But they just took it very seriously. So what I've done is to kind of ape the violence that I've had before and it seems to get a good reaction."

Meyer said the film cost almost as much as Ultravixens "simply because I had to do so many inserts and so forth. The cost of additional shooting can be very substantial. You have to consider the escalation of lab costs."

Reception
Meyer later said he was "not particularly" pleased with the film. "At the time I was fairly pleased, but I see a lot of reasons why it was not as successful as Supervixen is."

References

External links
 
Up! at TCMDB
Up! at Letterbox DVD
 

Films directed by Russ Meyer
1976 films
1970s sex comedy films
American sex comedy films
Films with screenplays by Roger Ebert
Films with screenplays by Russ Meyer
Films set in California
1976 comedy films
1970s English-language films
Roger Ebert
Works by Roger Ebert
Siskel and Ebert
1970s American films